McConn is a surname. Notable people with the surname include:

 Brittney McConn (born 1980), American figure skater
 Jim McConn (1928–1997), American businessman and mayor

See also
 McCann (surname)
 McCunn